Joseph Saraceno (May 16, 1937 – October 15, 2015) was an American record producer. He was a producer for The Ventures and produced over 300 singles and albums. Gifted at finding pop music that would sell, he produced several singles with Michael Gordon of primarily instrumental tunes, that while they did not top the charts, they sold extremely well. 
Tunes such as "Outer Limits", "Let's Go", and others get regular play on Top 40 "Oldie" stations.
Saraceno produced the Sunshine Company smashes “Happy” and “Back On The Streets Again.”
He also produced Mercury recording artists Fire & Rain’s Hot 100 single “Hello Stranger.”
His nephew Domenic  Saraceno,jr went on to form an 80s band called Flank Drive With Domenic Saraceno,Steve Miller, Mike Scott, and Tyler Wingreen singer in 1985 playing at Such places as Madame Wongs East and West and various clubs in Hollywood.

References

External links
 
 
 

1937 births
2015 deaths
Record producers from New York (state)